King of Thorns may refer to:

King of Thorn, Japanese manga series
King of Thorns, The second book in The Broken Empire series by Mark Lawrence